Iván Márquez Álvarez (born 9 June 1994) is a Spanish professional footballer who plays as a central defender for Eredivisie club NEC Nijmegen.

Career
Márquez was born in Marbella, Málaga, Andalusia, and represented Málaga CF as a youth. He made his debut for the reserves on 13 October 2013, coming on as a late substitute in a 1–2 Tercera División away loss against Linares Deportivo.

Rarely used by Málaga, Márquez subsequently served loan stints at UD San Pedro and CD El Palo, the latter in Segunda División B. On 23 June 2015, he joined another reserve team, Atlético Madrid B in the fourth tier.

On 28 July 2016, Márquez moved to CA Osasuna, being assigned to the reserves in the third division. He made his first team debut on 30 November, starting in a 1–0 away loss against Granada CF, for the season's Copa del Rey.

Márquez made his La Liga debut on 4 December 2016, starting in a 3–1 loss at Sporting de Gijón.

On 5 August 2020, he signed with Cracovia.

Honours
Cracovia
 Polish Supercup: 2020

References

External links

1994 births
Living people
People from Marbella
Sportspeople from the Province of Málaga
Spanish footballers
Footballers from Andalusia
Association football defenders
La Liga players
Segunda División B players
Tercera División players
Ekstraklasa players
Eredivisie players
Atlético Malagueño players
UD San Pedro players
Atlético Madrid B players
CA Osasuna B players
CA Osasuna players
Korona Kielce players
MKS Cracovia (football) players
NEC Nijmegen players
Spanish expatriate footballers
Spanish expatriate sportspeople in Poland
Expatriate footballers in Poland
Spanish expatriate sportspeople in the Netherlands
Expatriate footballers in the Netherlands